The 1904–05 Harvard Crimson men's ice hockey season was the eighth season of play for the program.

Season

In December 1904 Harvard constructed two rinks inside the recently completed Harvard Stadium, allowing for the increasingly popular ice hockey team to be viewed by a large number of spectators. The Crimson played six games at home during the year, utterly dominating their opponents; Harvard outscored the visitors 74–7 including setting an all-time program record (as of 2019) in their first intercollegiate game by eviscerating MIT 25–0. The game saw double hat-tricks from both Callaway and Wilder as well as a goal from MIT's Tylee...on his own net. In the 18–0 drubbing of Springfield, Richard Townsend set a program record with 8 goals in the game, a feat he almost duplicated with a 7-goal game against Brown.

For the third straight year Harvard finished undefeated, claiming another intercollegiate title, and extending their winning streak to 26 games.

Roster

Standings

Schedule and Results

|-
!colspan=12 style=";" | Regular Season

References

Harvard Crimson men's ice hockey seasons
Harvard
Harvard
Harvard
Harvard
Harvard